Rucamanqui Airport ,  is an airport  northeast of Huépil (es), a town in the Bío Bío Region of Chile.

See also

Transport in Chile
List of airports in Chile

References

External links
OpenStreetMap - Rucamanqui
OurAirports - Rucamanqui
FallingRain - Rucamanqui Airport

Airports in Chile
Airports in Biobío Region